Peter Clements (born 23 January 1953) is an Australian cricketer. He played five first-class matches for South Australia between 1972 and 1975.

See also
 List of South Australian representative cricketers

References

External links
 

1953 births
Living people
Australian cricketers
South Australia cricketers
Cricketers from Adelaide